Munkir is a Pakistani dramatic romance TV show. This drama is directed by Nadeem Siddiqui, written by Zafar Mairaj and produced by Everyday Entertainment. It originally aired on TVOne.

Plot 

Rona is an innocent girl who is about to marry Zain. Rona got a dream about her teacher (sister Katherine). She goes to her teacher place to see her where she met Gulraiz who is a brainwashed militant. Gulraiz fall in love with Rona but when he found that Rona is going to marry Zain, he makes dirty plans against them.

Rona finally gets engaged to Zain after several misunderstandings and conflicts. On their wedding night, Gulraiz threatens Rona and then when Rona and Zain go to save Gulraiz, he takes off his bomb suit and suddenly someone shoots Gulraiz.

Cast 
Nida Khan as Rona
Osman Khalid Butt as Zain al-Abedin Khan
Ahmed Ali Akbar as Gulraiz
Mariyam Nafees as Anjum
Mehmood Akhtar as Rona's father
Mahjabeen as Rania, Rona's stepmother
Sultana Zafar as Dado, Rona's grandmother
Naila Jaffri as Kolsum Bano, Zain's mother
Noor ul Hassan as Majid, Zain's brother-in-law
Farhana Maqsood as Ghulam Sughra, Zain's sister
Qavi Khan as Mursheed Sayi

References

Pakistani drama television series
2016 Pakistani television series debuts
2017 Pakistani television series endings
Urdu-language television shows
TVOne Pakistan